Eric Anthony Sato (born May 5, 1966 in Santa Monica, California) is a former American volleyball player, who was a member of the United States men's national volleyball team that won the gold medal at the 1988 Summer Olympics in Seoul, South Korea. He was serving (jump serve) and defensive specialist. After the Olympics he played pro beach volleyball.

His sister Liane also played volleyball in both the 1988 and 1992 Olympic games, capturing a bronze medal in 1992.

His niece Katie plays libero for Cal State Northridge.

References

External links

 
 USA Olympic Team
 KarchAcademy
 
 

1966 births
Living people
American men's volleyball players
American men's beach volleyball players
Volleyball players at the 1988 Summer Olympics
Volleyball players at the 1992 Summer Olympics
Olympic gold medalists for the United States in volleyball
Olympic bronze medalists for the United States in volleyball
Medalists at the 1988 Summer Olympics
American sportspeople of Japanese descent
Sportspeople from Santa Monica, California
Place of birth missing (living people)
Medalists at the 1992 Summer Olympics